Stanisław Łoza (1573–1639) was a Roman Catholic prelate who served as Auxiliary Bishop of Lutsk (1632–1639) and Titular Bishop of Argos (1632–1639).

Biography
Stanisław Łoza was born in Łozy in 1573. On 26 March 1632, he was selected by the King of Poland and confirmed by Pope Urban VIII on 12 June 1634 as Auxiliary Bishop of Lutsk and Titular Bishop of Argos. On 4 March 1635, he was consecrated bishop by Maciej Łubieński, Bishop of Włocławek, with Jerzy Tyszkiewicz, Bishop of Žemaičiai, and Andrzej Gembicki, Titular Bishop of Teodosia, serving as co-consecrators.  He served as Auxiliary Bishop of Lutsk until his death in 1639.

References

External links and additional sources
 (for Chronology of Bishops) 
 (for Chronology of Bishops)  
 (for Chronology of Bishops) 
 (for Chronology of Bishops)  

17th-century Roman Catholic bishops in the Polish–Lithuanian Commonwealth
Bishops appointed by Pope Urban VIII
1639 deaths
1573 births